Lucas Bryant (born September 28, 1978) is a Canadian-American actor. Bryant is most well known for his role as Nathan Wuornos in the Syfy TV channel series Haven (2010–2015).

Early life
Bryant was born in Elmira, Ontario, Canada to Susan Hodges Bryant and M. Darrol Bryant;  he has dual Canadian and U.S. citizenship. His father's from North Dakota and of "Scandinavian/Finnish heritage". His mother was also born and raised in the United States. Bryant graduated from Elmira District Secondary School and studied acting at Sheridan College in Oakville, Ontario.

Acting career
He was the star of the short-lived UPN television series Sex, Love & Secrets. For television, Bryant has appeared in the movie More Sex and the Single Mom, as well as guest starred in the series Queer as Folk, Odyssey 5 and Playmakers. He has also starred in Canadian television projects, including Crazy Canucks, An American in Canada and The Eleventh Hour. Bryant has appeared on stage all over Canada in many productions, including The Crucible and The King and I. Bryant appeared as Gabe McCall on the CBC drama MVP: The Secret Lives of Hockey Wives.

In 2006, Bryant starred as Calvin Puddie in the TV movie Playing House based on the book by Patricia Pearson. He also starred as Brad in the short musical I Hate Musicals. Bryant had supporting roles in the movies A Very Merry Daughter of the Bride and The Vow.  In 2010, he and Haven co-star Emily Rose previously starred together in the 2010 "made-for-TV" suspense-thriller Perfect Plan.

In 2010, Bryant landed a lead role as Nathan in Haven, a TV series based on Stephen King's novel "The Colorado Kid". In "Haven," Bryant plays 'Nathan Wuornos,' the wry, hardened local cop who somewhat reluctantly becomes the partner of new-to-town FBI agent 'Audrey Parker,' played by Emily Rose. BuddyTV ranked him #72 on its list of "TV's Sexiest Men of 2011".

In late 2012, Bryant starred in the Lifetime original movie Merry In-Laws. Bryant played Peter, a teacher who becomes engaged to an astronomer. When she meets his parents she learns that they are really Mr. and Mrs. Santa Claus. The film co-stars former Cheers stars George Wendt and Shelley Long as Mr. and Mrs. Claus. The film is directed by Leslie Hope who previously directed Bryant in A Very Merry Daughter of the Bride. In 2013, he guest-starred in shows CSI: Crime Scene Investigation, Cracked and Beauty & the Beast.

In 2015, Bryant played the role of Count Johan Oxenstierna in the historical drama The Girl King. In 2016, he and his Haven co-star Emily Rose had supporting role in the movie Secret Summer, which priemered on PixL. In summer 2016, he starred as Tom Novak in the Hallmark Original Movie Tulips in Spring co-starring Fiona Gubelmann. He also starred as Colin Fitzgerlad in another Hallmark movie Summer Love co-starring Rachael Leigh Cook. In fall, he starred in the highly anticipated CBC series from Jennifer Holness and Sudz Sutherland, Shoot the Messenger.

Personal life
Bryant is married to Australian-born actress and personal trainer Kirsty Hinchcliffe. They have a daughter born in August 2008  and, as of July 2010, live in Santa Monica, California. They also have a son, born in 2015.

Filmography

Film

Television

References

External links

Audio interview with Lucas Bryant about 'Haven'

1978 births
Canadian male film actors
Canadian male television actors
Living people
People from Woolwich, Ontario
21st-century American male actors
American male film actors
American male television actors
Canadian emigrants to the United States
Male actors from Santa Monica, California
Male actors from Ontario
21st-century Canadian male actors
Sheridan College alumni
American people of Finnish descent
Canadian people of Finnish descent
Canadian expatriate male actors in the United States